Irina Palina (born 15 January 1970) is a former female international table tennis player from Russia.

Table tennis career
She won a gold medal in the Women's Team event at the Table Tennis World Cup in 1994.

She also won an English Open title.

See also
 List of table tennis players
 List of World Table Tennis Championships medalists

References

Living people
Russian female table tennis players
Table tennis players at the 1992 Summer Olympics
Table tennis players at the 1996 Summer Olympics
Table tennis players at the 2000 Summer Olympics
Table tennis players at the 2004 Summer Olympics
Olympic table tennis players of Russia
Olympic table tennis players of the Unified Team
1970 births
20th-century Russian women
21st-century Russian women